Marius Mihai Lăcătuș (born 5 April 1964) is a Romanian football coach and former professional footballer. He is by far the most successful footballer ever to play for Steaua București and was part of their European Cup victory in 1986. Lăcătuș is the all-time top scorer for Steaua with 16 goals in European competitions. On 7 July 2021, Steaua retired his shirt number 7 at the inauguration match of the new Steaua Stadium.

He played as a deep lying striker or inside forward for Steaua București most of his career, being the team's captain between 1994 and 1999. He also played for Italian side Fiorentina and Real Oviedo in Spain.

He is the most successful player who has ever played in the Romanian First League. He has won it a record number of ten times. Following him in the all time table are: Giedrius Arlauskis, Ciprian Deac, Adrian Bumbescu, Mircea Lucescu, Dumitru Stângaciu and Tudorel Stoica, all with 7 championships won.

Club career
Lăcătuș was an iconic player for Steaua București's supporters. Even now, many years after leaving the club as a player, the supporters shout his name at home games. The supporters loved him for his spectacular way of playing football, as well as for his commitment during the games. He was nicknamed Fiara (The Beast).

He was the first player to score in the penalty shoot-out of the 1986 European Cup final against FC Barcelona, won by Steaua. After the 1990 FIFA World Cup in Italy, where he scored two goals against the USSR, Lăcătuș signed for the Italian team ACF Fiorentina and then moved to Real Oviedo in Spain. In 1994, he returned to Steaua and played for the team until 1999, when he finally signed for FC Național București, where he played only for half a season before retiring. However, in October 2006 he decided to enroll himself as part of UT Arad team where he was also coach until 2007 before he joined FCSB.

On 25 March 2008, he was decorated by the president of Romania, Traian Băsescu with Ordinul "Meritul Sportiv" — (Order of Sporting Merit) class II for his part in winning the 1986 European Cup Final.

Lăcătuș played a total of 414 games in the Romanian Divizia A (now Liga I), scoring 103 goals; 21 games in the Italian Serie A where he scored three times and also 51 games in the Spanish La Liga, scoring 7 goals. He also made appearances 72 games in the European Cup, Cup Winners' Cup and UEFA Cup, scoring 16 goals.

As a player, he won the Romanian championship ten times and the Romanian Cup seven times, as well as the European Cup in 1986 and the European Supercup in 1987, all with Steaua București.

International career
Lăcătuș was capped 83 times, scoring 13 goals for the Romania national team, and played for his country in the 1990 World Cup, Euro 1996 and 1998 World Cup. He scored the 700th goal for the national team of Romania.

Career statistics
Scores and results list Romania's goal tally first, score column indicates score after each Lăcătuș goal.

Honours

Player
Steaua București
Divizia A (10, record): 1984–85, 1985–86, 1986–87, 1987–88, 1988–89, 1993–94, 1994–95, 1995–96, 1996–97, 1997–98 (Record)
Romanian Cup (6): 1984–85, 1986–87, 1988–89, 1995–96, 1996–97, 1998–99
Romanian Super Cup: 1994, 1995, 1998
European Cup: 1985–86, Runner-up: 1988–89
European Super Cup: 1986
Intercontinental Cup Runner-up: 1986
Note: Lăcătuș is the Romanian footballer who won the most domestic awards.

Notes

References

External links
 
 Marius Lăcătuș (Statistics as coach) 
 

1964 births
Living people
Sportspeople from Brașov
Romanian footballers
Olympic footballers of Romania
Romania international footballers
FC Steaua București players
FC Steaua București presidents
1990 FIFA World Cup players
1998 FIFA World Cup players
Association football forwards
Association football wingers
La Liga players
Real Oviedo players
Expatriate footballers in Italy
Expatriate footballers in Spain
UEFA Euro 1996 players
Romanian football managers
FC Steaua București managers
FC Steaua București assistant managers
ASC Oțelul Galați managers
Liga I players
Romanian expatriate footballers
ACF Fiorentina players
Serie A players
FC Progresul București players
FC Brașov (1936) players
FC Brașov (1936) managers
FC Vaslui managers
ASA 2013 Târgu Mureș managers
FC Politehnica Iași (2010) managers
CSM Ceahlăul Piatra Neamț managers
CSA Steaua București managers